Holyhead railway station serves the Welsh town of Holyhead on Holy Island, Anglesey. It connects with the Port of Holyhead ferry terminal. The station is connected to the town centre by a stainless steel pedestrian/cycle bridge named The Celtic Gateway.

History

The first station in Holyhead was opened by the Chester and Holyhead Railway on 1 August 1848, but this was replaced by the second on 15 May 1851.

The present station was opened by the London and North Western Railway on 17 January 1866 and still retains its overall roof. It is believed to be the longest train shed in Wales. It originally had four platforms, but only three are currently in use, the track to the former platform three having been lifted. The station approach contains a Grade II listed clock turret which was unveiled on 17 June 1878 by Albert Edward, Prince of Wales to mark completion of old harbour extension. The clock is by J. B. Joyce & Co of Whitchurch.

Platform one on the western side of the station is separated from the other two by the ferry terminal buildings and inner harbour and is the one normally used by Avanti West Coast services to London Euston. Most Transport for Wales DMU services use platform two. Platform three is outside the train shed and is used by the early morning Premier Service to Cardiff Central, plus a few other trains at busy periods.  There are carriage sidings and servicing facilities alongside platform one, whilst platform three also has an engine release line & run-round loop available.

A rail-served container terminal next to the station closed in 1991 when the traffic transferred to Liverpool. It has since been demolished and is now used as a car parking area for the Stena Line ferry service.

Passenger ships previously used to berth in the inner harbour next to Platform 1, this ceased when the port was re-developed. Stena Line built an administration building between platforms 1 and 2 in the early 1990s.

Stationmasters

Charles Massingberd 1848 - 1879  
William Guest 1879 - 1906
Joseph Jones until 1912 (afterwards station master at London Euston)
Andrew William Taylor 1912 - 1913 (formerly station master at Flint, afterwards station master at Wigan)
Hugh Morgan 1913 - 1936
H.W. Smith 1936 - 1942

Facilities

The station is fully staffed, with the ticket office in the main ferry terminal being staffed seven days a week. Self-service ticket machines are also provided. The terminal offers covered waiting accommodation, a payphone, a photo booth, a left luggage office, toilets, shops, and a cafe. Train running details are offered via digital information screens, timetable posters and automated announcements. Step-free access is available to all platforms.

Services

Holyhead is served by a basic Transport for Wales hourly service throughout the week (although less frequently on winter Sundays) to Shrewsbury with services continuing to Birmingham International and Cardiff Central on alternate hours. A limited number of trains (mostly early morning and late evening) run to/from Crewe, whilst two services operate to Manchester Piccadilly on weekdays only. Most Sunday services run to/from Crewe.

Avanti West Coast operate services to London Euston and Crewe via the West Coast Main Line. On weekdays, there are 4 trains per day to London Euston, as well as 3 trains per day which run only as far as Crewe. On Saturdays, there are 3 trains per day to London Euston and 1 train to Crewe, and on Sundays there are 3 trains per day to London Euston.

Holyhead station adjoins the Port of Holyhead, where sailings to Dublin are operated by Irish Ferries and Stena Line. Up to September 2014 Stena Line operated a high-speed service to Dún Laoghaire, a suburb 12km south of Dublin City Centre.

References

Further reading

External links

Railway stations in Anglesey
DfT Category E stations
Former London and North Western Railway stations
Railway stations in Great Britain opened in 1848
Railway stations in Great Britain closed in 1851
Railway stations in Great Britain opened in 1851
Railway stations in Great Britain closed in 1866
Railway stations in Great Britain opened in 1866
Railway stations served by Transport for Wales Rail
Railway stations served by Avanti West Coast
Railway stations serving harbours and ports in the United Kingdom
Holyhead
1866 establishments in Wales
Grade II listed buildings in Anglesey
Stations on the West Coast Main Line